The Antiochus cylinder is a devotional cylinder written in traditional Akkadian by Antiochus I Soter, circa 250 BCE. Discovered in Borsippa, it is now located in the British Museum (BM 36277).

The text has been translated as follows:

References

Middle Eastern objects in the British Museum
Seleucid Empire
Akkadian inscriptions
Ancient Near and Middle East clay objects